Jure Dolenec (born 6 December 1988) is a Slovenian handball player who plays for Limoges Handball and the Slovenian national team.

He represented Slovenia at the 2013 World Men's Handball Championship. He also played at the
2015 World Championship and at the 2016 Summer Olympics.

References

External links

 

1988 births
Living people
Sportspeople from Kranj
Slovenian male handball players
Expatriate handball players
Slovenian expatriate sportspeople in France
Slovenian expatriate sportspeople in Spain
Olympic handball players of Slovenia
Handball players at the 2016 Summer Olympics
Montpellier Handball players
FC Barcelona Handbol players
Liga ASOBAL players